Clint Halden (born 20 January 1981) is an Australian former professional rugby league footballer who played for the Manly-Warringah Sea Eagles in the National Rugby League competition.

Background
Halden was born in Barellan, New South Wales, Australia.

References

External links
Manly Sea Eagles profile

1981 births
Australian rugby league players
Manly Warringah Sea Eagles players
Rugby league halfbacks
Rugby league hookers
Rugby league five-eighths
Rugby league centres
Living people
Rugby league players from New South Wales